The acronym UBL can also mean:

Hubli Junction railway station, station code:UBL
Ulster Bank Limited, a retail banking subsidiary of NatWest Group
Ultimate Band List 
United Bank Limited 
Unilever Bangladesh Limited
United Basketball League
Universal Business Language, an ISO standard XML vocabulary for invoices, purchase orders, waybills, etc. 
Usama bin Laden (1957–2011) Saudi Arabian terrorist and leader of al-Qaeda
Ubiquitin-like proteins